Khoon Ki Keemat is a 1974 Hindi-language thriller drama film directed by Shibu Mitra and produced by Jagdish Sharma. The film stars Ashok Kumar and Mahendra Sandhu.

Cast
 Ashok Kumar as John Fernandes
 Mahendra Sandhu as Deepak
 Neelam Mehra as Chanda
 Mehmood as Truck Driver
 Roopesh Kumar as Thakur
 Bharat Bhushan
 Aruna Irani as Billo

Music
"Hai Kismat Se Ye Mehfil Milti" - Asha Bhosle, Kishore Kumar
"Kaun Hai Tu Ye Jaan Liya" - Asha Bhosle
"Ari O Champa Chameli" - Asha Bhosle
"Beet Gaye Hai Kitne Zamaane" - Asha Bhosle
"Idher Aa Lait Ja" - Meenu Purushottam, Kishore Kumar

References

External links
 

1974 films
Films scored by Sonik-Omi
1970s Hindi-language films
1974 drama films
Films directed by Shibu Mitra
Indian thriller drama films